Nonstop (stylized in all caps) is the seventh extended play (EP) by South Korean girl group Oh My Girl. It was released by WM Entertainment on April 27, 2020 and distributed by Sony Music. The album contains five songs, including the lead single "Nonstop". The lead single, "Nonstop", set the record as the longest-running girl group song on MelOn Daily Chart Top 100 at August 20, 2021 with 480 days, and continued to chart for another 21 days.  It was then dethroned by their own b-side track "Dolphin" which charted for 546 consecutive days.

Track listing

Accolades

Charts

Release history

Notes

References

2020 EPs
Sony Music EPs
Korean-language EPs
Oh My Girl albums